Paul Takeo Bannai (July 4, 1920 – September 14, 2019) was an American politician who was the first Japanese American to ever serve in the California State Legislature. He served in the State Assembly as a Republican legislator from 1973 until 1980, when he was defeated for reelection by Democrat Richard Floyd.

Legislative career
He represented the 67th District in his first term but was then reapportioned into the 53rd District, where he served for the rest of his time in the legislature. Bannai served on the following committees: Criminal Justice, Finance and Insurance, Veterans Affairs, Ways and Means, and Rules.

Background
Bannai was born in Colorado in 1920 to Japanese immigrant parents.   In 1942, he was interned at Manzanar during World War II with his family due to Executive Order 9066.  From there, Bannai enlisted in the United States Army and served with the 442nd Infantry Regiment and the Army Intelligence Service.

Prior to serving in the legislature, Bannai served on the Gardena City Council and the Gardena Planning Commission. After his defeat, Bannai served as Chief Memorial Affairs Director for National Cemetery System which is part of the Veterans Administration.

He died in September 2019 at the age of 99.

References

External links
Join California Paul T. Bannai

1920 births
2019 deaths
People from Delta, Colorado
American military personnel of Japanese descent
American politicians of Japanese descent
United States Army personnel of World War II
Japanese-American internees
California politicians of Japanese descent
Republican Party members of the California State Assembly
People from Gardena, California
United States Army soldiers
20th-century American politicians
Asian conservatism in the United States